is a railway station in the city of Okazaki, Aichi Prefecture, Japan, operated by the third sector Aichi Loop Railway Company.

Lines

Station layout
The station has a two elevated opposed side platforms, with the station building located underneath. The station building has automated ticket machines, TOICA automated turnstiles and is staffed.

Platforms

Adjacent stations

Station history
At the time, the station had a single side platform. With the privatization of the JNR on April 1, 1987, the station came under control of JR Central. The station was transferred to the third sector Aichi Loop Railway Company on January 31, 1988.

Passenger statistics
In fiscal 2017, the station was used by an average of 1915 passengers daily.

Surrounding area
 Okazaki Castle
 Japan National Route 1

See also
 List of railway stations in Japan

References

External links

Official home page 

Railway stations in Japan opened in 1976
Railway stations in Aichi Prefecture
Okazaki, Aichi